A Catskill Eagle is the 12th Spenser novel by Robert B. Parker, first published in 1985. The title comes from a quote from Herman Melville.

Plot
Spenser, a private investigator in Boston. Spenser, who served as an infantryman in the 1st Infantry Division during the Korean War and as a former State trooper, receives a letter from his lover, Susan Silverman, who has relocated to the West Coast. His friend and associate, Hawk, is in jail and she needs help.

Storyline summary
Susan Silverman, in an effort to discover her own identity, has moved to the West Coast. There she engages a relationship with a wealthy heir, Russell Costigan. The story begins with her letter.

Spenser flies to San Francisco, California after making preparations to break Hawk, who served in the French Foreign Legion and in combat operations overseas and is a "Gun for Hire", out of jail using a gun hidden in the bottom of a fake leg cast. Spenser and Hawk then have to deal with a man rich enough to do anything he wants, legal or not. Spenser and Hawk follow Russell's trail across the country in an attempt to locate Susan and reunite her with Spenser. The book climaxes with a deadly encounter deep in an underground shelter between Spenser and the Costigans.

Characters
Several characters from previous books make an appearance in A Catskill Eagle.
Spenser: Boston private investigator
Hawk
Susan Silverman
Russell Costigan
Jerry Costigan
Grace Costigan
Henry Cimoli
Paul Giacomin (first seen in "Early Autumn")
Rachel Wallace (from "Looking for Rachel Wallace")
Lt. Martin Quirk, Boston PD
Sgt. Frank Belson, Boston PD 
Hugh Dixon, a wealthy previous client (from The Judas Goat)

References

1985 American novels
Spenser (novel series)
Novels set in San Francisco